The Philippines is not known, or believed, to possess weapons of mass destruction. Article II Section 8 of the Philippine Constitution explicitly forbids the presence of nuclear weapons in the Philippines.

The Philippines, as a ratifier to the Biological Weapons Convention, bans all production and import of biological weapons in the country. It also signed the Southeast Asian Nuclear-Weapon-Free Zone Treaty, thus promoting a nuclear-weapons-free Southeast Asia.

Nuclear energy and weapons

The Philippine nuclear program started in 1958 with the creation of the Philippine Atomic Energy Commission (PAEC) under Republic Act 2067. A year after Ferdinand Marcos declared martial law in 1972, he announced the decision to build a nuclear power plant at Bataan. Marcos reasoned that this was in response to the 1973 oil crisis, as the Middle East oil embargo had put a heavy strain on the Philippine economy. He temporarily suspended construction in 1979 citing health and safety concerns. The plant was completed in 1984. However, two years later in 1986, the year in which Marcos was ousted from power following the People Power Revolution, and the same year in which the reactor at Chernobyl, Soviet Union (now part of Ukraine) accidentally exploded, the new president Corazon Aquino decided not to operate the plant due to the proximity to a major geological fault and to then dormant stratovolcano Mt. Pinatubo which erupted in 1991.

In 2016, Senator Juan Ponce Enrile, a former defence secretary under the Marcos administration, claimed that the Bataan Nuclear Power Plant was intended to be used in a development of a nuclear weapons program. While he maintained that the facility's main purpose was for electricity generation he alleged that the nuclear power plant's second purpose is for nuclear weapons production. Enrile speculated that if the Philippines had successfully developed nuclear weapons, China would be deterred in pursuing aggressive claims in the South China Sea. However he admitted that he was not aware on the mechanics and technology in the production of nuclear weapons himself.

During the Cold War, specifically at the time of Ferdinand Marcos from 1965 to 1986, American nuclear warheads were secretly stockpiled in the country. The Filipino public never knew of it until much later after the regime, and only Marcos knew of it as he was secretly informed by American military advisers as early as 1966. Currently, however, there was a movement in the country that aims to stop construction of nuclear power plants in the country and terminate American military presence in the country, which were believed to house nuclear weapons on Philippine soil.

Despite provocations by China since 2010s amidst the South China Sea disputes, President Benigno Simeon Aquino III disagreed on letting the Philippines have nuclear weapons. He justified it from the lack of government funds to create such weapon, coupled with the fact that having such weapon would only escalate tensions between the two countries.

In 2019, Juan Ponce Enrile reiterates his earlier claims in 2016 that the Philippines should have developed nuclear weapons to assert its claims, particularly in reinforcing the Philippines v. China international arbitration ruling, regarding its territorial disputes with China. Defense secretary Delfin Lorenzana in response to Enrile's statement said that the Philippines is not planning to develop nuclear weapons due to the country's limited technological capabilities as well as legal obligations such as being party to the Non-Proliferation Treaty. In fact, the Philippines had signed the Treaty on the Prohibition of Nuclear Weapons on 20 September 2017, and would proceed to ratify it on 18 February 2021.

Biological and chemical weapons
Rebels from the communist New People's Army were accused of using biological weapons against the Armed Forces of the Philippines in eastern Mindanao, but they refuted such a claim.

Philippines signed the Chemical Weapons Convention in 1993.

References

See also 

Foreign relations of the Philippines
Armed Forces of the Philippines
Politics of the Philippines
Weapons of mass destruction by country